Call Girl is a 2007 Portuguese film directed by António-Pedro Vasconcelos starring Soraia Chaves, Nicolau Breyner, Ivo Canelas and Joaquim de Almeida. It was the highest-grossing Portuguese film in 2007.

References

2007 films
2000s Portuguese-language films
Films directed by António-Pedro Vasconcelos
Golden Globes (Portugal) winners